Henri Surbatis (23 June 1922 – 5 May 2000) was a French racing cyclist. He rode in the 1954 Tour de France.

References

1922 births
2000 deaths
French male cyclists